Semyon Lyvovich Ferdman PAR, better known by his stage name Semyon Farada (born December 31, 1933, Nikolskoye village of Moscow Oblast, USSR —  died August 20, 2009 in Moscow) was a Soviet and Russian stage and film actor.

Early life 
Ferdman was born into the Jewish family of Army officer Lev Ferdman and pharmacist Ida Shuman. His father died when Semyon was 14. Later he tried to pursue a military career but failed the physical test at the Tank Forces School. He applied to Bauman Moscow State Technical University (then MVTU) and barely passed the exams; after three years in the classes he was drafted into the Baltic Fleet where he served for four years. The navy noticed Ferdman's artistic talent and assigned him to the Garrison Theatre in Baltiysk. There, while playing the part of a long-haired anarchist on stage, he was the only Baltic Fleet sailor allowed to wear long hair.

Career 
The navy provided Ferdman with recommendations to Moscow theatre directors, but he obeyed his mother's will and completed his courses at Bauman University, graduating in 1962. He worked as a mechanical engineer until 1969, and played as an amateur with Mark Rozovsky company based at Moscow University. Ferdman first appeared on screen in 1967. His stage name Farada was a nickname that emerged in one of his  early filming tours of Central Asia. A studio manager refused to insert a Jewish surname, Ferdman, into film credits, and when Ferdman pressed him to "just invent some charade" (sharada), found nothing better than Sharada Farada. Farada stuck with the actor.

In 1972, after authorities shut down the Rozovsky theatre, Yury Lyubimov recruited Farada to work at the Taganka Theatre with whom he remained until his death. Farada played in more than 70 films, notably with directors Mark Zakharov, Eldar Ryazanov and Aleksey German.

A stroke in June 2000 after the funeral of his friend, playwright Grigory Gorin, forced Farada to retire from acting. He was married to actress Maria Politseymako and was father of actor Mikhail Politseymako, who both supported him in his final years.

Selected filmography 
Acting
 The Very Same Munchhausen (Тот самый Мюнхгаузен, 1979) as Commander-in-Chief
 The Garage (Гараж, 1980) as Trombonist
 Charodey (Чародеи, 1982) as Guest from South
 The House That Swift Built (Дом, который построил Свифт, 1982) as Governor
 Formula of Love (Формула любви, 1984) as Margadon
 After the Rain, on Thursday (После дождичка в четверг, 1985) as Shah Babadur
 How to Become Happy (Как стать счастливым, 1986) as Kolobok
 Gardemarines ahead! (Гардемарины, вперёд!, 1988) as director of Moscow School of Mathematics and Navigation
 Private Detective, or Operation Cooperation (Частный детектив, или Операция «Кооперация», 1989) as Mafioso
Voice acting
 Entrance to the Labyrinth (Вход в лабиринт, 1989) as Pontyaga
 Adventures of Captain Vrungel (Приключения капитана Врунгеля, 1989) as Giulico Banditto

References

External links 

1933 births
2009 deaths
Burials in Troyekurovskoye Cemetery
Russian male film actors
Russian male stage actors
Soviet Jews
Jewish Russian actors
Honored Artists of the RSFSR
People's Artists of Russia
Bauman Moscow State Technical University alumni
Russian male television actors